Līna Čanka was a Latvian Corporal of World War I and Latvian War of Independence. She was within the  under the pseudonym of "Jānis Čanka" and was known as the first woman to be a recipient of the Order of Lāčplēsis, the highest military award of Latvia.

Military career
Līna Čanka was born on November 5, 1893 in a agricultural family of the farm "Mežziles" within the vicinity of the Renda Parish with 4 sisters and 1 brother. At the beginning of World War I, her family went as refugees to Ukraine, but Līna stayed in Riga where with her deceased brother's documents and the nickname "Jānis", she voluntarily joined the Latvian Riflemen. During the war, she'd often repeat the ohrase:

After her true sex was revealed in 1915, she continued to serve within the Pavasaru manor in Sloka and despite being wounded, she remained remained in the frontlines and continued the battle under continuous enemy fire until she was wounded a second time. During her service within Russia, she was awarded the Order of Saint George, III and IV class as well as promoted to the rank of corporal.

Retirement and Burial
She retired in 1920 and in May 1921, received a new farm in Lielrendas named "Virsaiši" where she became a farmer during the era of Latvian independence. She also received the Order of Lāčplēsis, III Class in 1921 and in 1927, she was awarded the Order of the Three Stars, IV Class. She later married Robert Freudenfeld. During the Great Depression however, she got into financial debt and had to take a loan in order to pay off the debt but when she had to pay off the loan, despite going for the Council of the Military Order of Lāčplēsis for financial aid, the debt was too great and was forced to sell her farm in 1934 and had to settle for a smaller one at Kannieniekos, Matkule Parish.

Her new property didn't last long either as it was sold in 1937 and bought an even smaller farm called "Laimas" at Milzkalne Parish, Tukuma District. They then sold that farm in favor of "Eglītes" in the Zalenieki Parish. During the late 1930s, it was reported that Čanka willingly stayed away from public life, preferring to live a simpler life with her husband. After the outbreak of World War II, her foster son enlisted in the Latvian SS Volunteer Legion and Čanka opened a canteen for the legionnaires along with her husband as well as delivering supplies of food and goods to Latvian legionnaires serving in the Eastern Front.

After the Second World War, she became a repressed citizen of the Latvian SSR, losing all of her property. She spent the rest of her life in the Reģi nursing home in Kuldīga District where she would die on June 9, 1981. In 1989, she was reburied in her family cemetery in Renda Parish.

References

1893 births
1981 deaths
Women in World War I
Latvian people of World War I
Women in European warfare
People from Kuldīga Municipality
Recipients of the Order of Lāčplēsis, 3rd class
Russian military personnel of World War I
Latvian military personnel of the Latvian War of Independence
Latvian collaborators with Nazi Germany
Recipients of the Order of the Three Stars